O'Melveny Park is a public park located in the Santa Susana Mountains, in the Granada Hills community of the northern San Fernando Valley, in the northernmost portion of the City of Los Angeles, California.

History
The park is named after Henry W. O'Melveny, in 1927 one of the original members of the California State Parks Commission.   Originally called C.J. Ranch, O'Melveny Park was purchased in 1941 by attorney John O'Melveny of O’Melveny & Myers and later acquired by The Trust for Public Land and turned into a park.

Park
O'Melveny Park is the second largest public park in Los Angeles after Griffith Park.  O'Melveny Park is managed by the City of Los Angeles Department of Recreation and Parks.

It provides large grassy areas, picnic tables, and is known for its hiking and horse trails and the views they lead to. Near the entrance is a grove of citrus trees, nearly all of which are Grapefruit.

A caretaker resides in a residence in the park.

See also
Santa Susana Mountains
California chaparral and woodlands - Ecoregion
Chaparral - plant community
California oak woodland - plant community
Oaks - List of Quercus species
Quercus agrifolia

References

External links
 Santa Monica Mountains Conservancy
 City of Los Angeles Department of Recreation and Parks

Parks in the San Fernando Valley
Santa Susana Mountains
Granada Hills, Los Angeles
Parks in Los Angeles County, California
Regional parks in California